Île-Bigras was a commuter rail station operated by the Réseau de transport métropolitain (RTM) in Laval, Quebec, Canada.

It was served by the Deux-Montagnes line. It is a future Réseau express métropolitain station.

Connecting bus routes 
STL (taxibus T26  only), which goes across the bridge to connect with the nearby bus routes on chemin du Bord-de-l'Eau (26, 76, 402, 404 and 903) if they wish to travel within Laval.

See also 
 Île Bigras
 List of crossings of the Rivière des Prairies

References

External links
 Île-Bigras Commuter Train Station Information (RTM)
 Île-Bigras Commuter Train Station Schedule (RTM)

Former Exo commuter rail stations
Railway stations in Laval, Quebec
Réseau express métropolitain railway stations